Alexandrovka is a rural locality (a village) in Inzersky Selsoviet, Beloretsky District, Bashkortostan, Russia. The population was 11 as of 2010. There is 1 street.

Geography 
Alexandrovka is located 107 km northwest of Beloretsk (the district's administrative centre) by road. Nizhnyaya Tyulma is the nearest rural locality.

References 

Rural localities in Beloretsky District